Andrew Jackson "Jack" Joyner (August 4, 1861 – September 1, 1943) was an American Thoroughbred horse racing Hall of Fame trainer and owner.

Known as "Jack" and reported as "A.J." and "A. Jack", Joyner was born in Enfield, North Carolina, the son of Dr. and Mrs. Henry Joyner. A fan of horse racing, in 1879 the seventeen-year-old Joyner had hung a series of racing pictures on the wall in the small town post office where he was working when they were spotted by future U.S. Racing Hall of Fame trainer William Burch. Joyner's enthusiasm led to Burch offering him a job with his racing stable. From there, Jack Joyner went work for a short time as a jockey before turning to the training horses. He saddled his first winner in 1884 in a career that would span fifty-nine years. From that, six years were spent in England following passage of State of New York Hart–Agnew anti-betting law in 1908, the year he won more races than any trainer in the United States.

Jack Joyner's abilities led to him training for major owners such as James B. A. Haggin, Sydney Paget, and for Harry Payne Whitney and August Belmont Jr. whose horses he raced in England including Whisk Broom II.  In addition, Joyner owned and raced a number of horses for himself both in the United States and in England. Jack Joyner worked in England from the time the racing season opened on March 23, 1909  until November 1915 when he returned to the United States  and began a twenty-five-year association as trainer for stable owner George D. Widener, Jr.

During his career, Jack Joyner trained five Champions:
 Ethelbert, American Champion Three-Year-Old Male Horse (1899)
 Waterboy, American Champion Older Male Horse (1903)
 Hamburg Belle, American Champion Two-Year-Old Filly (1903)
 St. James, American Champion Two-Year-Old Colt (1923)
 Jamestown,  American Champion Two-Year-Old Colt (1930)

Jack Joyner died on September 1, 1943, at age eighty-two at George Widener's  Erdenheim Stud at Chestnut Hill, Pennsylvania. Following its creation, he was part of the inaugural class inducted in the National Museum of Racing and Hall of Fame in 1955.

For a time, Keeneland Race Course in Lexington, Kentucky, ran the A. J. Joyner Handicap, a six furlong event that notably was won by Whirlaway in 1941.

References

1861 births
1943 deaths
People from Enfield, North Carolina
American  racehorse trainers
American Champion racehorse trainers
American racehorse owners and breeders
United States Thoroughbred Racing Hall of Fame inductees